Matthew Hadrian Marshall Carrington, Baron Carrington of Fulham (born 19 October 1947) is a British politician. Formerly the Conservative Member of Parliament for Fulham from 1987 to 1997, in September 2013 Carrington was made a life peer and member of the House of Lords.

Early life
Carrington was born in London and was educated at the Lycée Français Charles de Gaulle and Imperial College London, during which time he chaired the Imperial College Conservative Society and graduated with a BSc and ARCS in Physics in 1969. He then attended the London Business School, where he received an MBA. He was a banker with the First National Bank of Chicago (now the First Chicago Bank) between 1974 and 1978, and then the Saudi International Bank between 1978 and 1987. He subsequently became chairman of the Outdoor Advertising Association and chief executive of the Retail Motor Industry Federation.

Political career
Carrington first stood for Parliament at Tottenham in 1979, coming second to the incumbent Labour MP Norman Atkinson.

He unsuccessfully contested the Fulham seat at a by-election in 1986 but won it at the general election a year later, defeating the Labour by-election victor Nick Raynsford (who returned to Parliament five years later as the Member for Greenwich). Carrington was Parliamentary Private Secretary to John Patten when he was a Home Office Minister between November 1990 and April 1992, and then when Patten was promoted to Secretary of State for Education. Carrington returned to the backbenches before joining John Major's government against as an Assistant Whip between 1996 and the 1997 general election, simultaneously serving as Chairman of the Treasury Select Committee.

The Fulham constituency disappeared in the boundary changes ahead of the 1997 election, and Carrington was selected as the Conservative candidate for the new Hammersmith and Fulham constituency, but was defeated by the Labour candidate Iain Coleman. He failed to regain the seat at the 2001 general election, but Carrington stayed active in local politics, and was elected Chairman of the Kensington, Chelsea and Fulham Conservatives on 28 March 2012. On 11 September 2013 he was created a life peer taking the title Baron Carrington of Fulham, of Fulham in the London Borough of Hammersmith and Fulham. Carrington is a non-executive director of the Sharia-compliant Gatehouse Bank and the Arab-British Chamber of Commerce, as well as a trustee of St John's, Notting Hill.

Personal life
Carrington was married to Mary Lou, who died in 2008. Mary Lou held senior positions at the London International Financial Futures and Options Exchange between 1985 and 1998, and was an assistant vice president of the First National Bank of Chicago, where Matthew Carrington had also worked. Mary Lou had also been elected a common councilman for the City of London ward of Lime Street. They had one daughter together.

References

Conservative Party (UK) MPs for English constituencies
1947 births
Living people
UK MPs 1987–1992
UK MPs 1992–1997
Conservative Party (UK) life peers
People from Fulham
People educated at Lycée Français Charles de Gaulle
Alumni of Imperial College London
Alumni of London Business School
Life peers created by Elizabeth II